Federal Route 77, or Jalan Kroh, is a federal road in Perak, Malaysia. The roads connects Pengkalan Hulu town until Pengkalan Hulu Checkpoint of the Malaysia-Thailand Border. It is a main route to Betong, the southern gateway of Thailand.

Route background
The Kilometre Zero of the Federal Route 77 starts at the Malaysia-Thailand border near Pengkalan Hulu Checkpoint, Perak.

History
This road has a notable history especially during World War II and the Communist insurgency in Malaysia (1968–89).

Battle of Malaya (1941-1942)
The Federal Route 77 became a main route for Japanese Imperial forces from Pattani to Singapore during the Battle of Malaya between 1941 and 1942.

Communist insurgency in Malaysia (1968–1989)
On 17 June 1968, to mark the 20th anniversary of their armed struggle against the Malaysian Government, the Communist Party of Malaya (CPM) launched an ambush against security forces in the area of Kroh–Betong road not far between Pengkalan Hulu town and Malaysia-Thailand border. They achieved a major success, killing 17 members of the security forces. This event marked the start of the second armed revolt of the Communist Party of Malaya known as Communist insurgency in Malaysia (1968–89). The Federal Route 77 was put under strict security control by Malaysian army. Motorists were allowed to use the road at daytime only due to security reasons. The military control of the road was lifted after the insurgency ended in 1989.

Features

At most sections, the Federal Route 77 was built under the JKR R5 road standard, allowing maximum speed limit of up to 90 km/h.

List of junctions and towns

References

077